Dunbar Castle was one of the strongest fortresses in Scotland, situated in a prominent position overlooking the harbour of the town of Dunbar, in East Lothian.  Several fortifications were built successively on the site, near the English-Scottish border.  The last was slighted in 1567; it is a ruin today.

Structure
The body of buildings measured in excess of one hundred and sixty five feet from east to west, and in some places up to two hundred and ten feet from north to south. The South Battery, which Grose supposes to have been the citadel or keep, is situated on a detached perpendicular rock, only accessible on one side, seventy two feet high, and is connected to the main part of the castle by a passage of masonry measuring sixty nine feet. The interior of the citadel measures fifty four feet by sixty within the walls. Its shape is octagonal. Five of the gun-ports remain, which are called the 'arrow-holes'. They measure four feet at the mouth and only sixteen inches at the other end. The buildings are arched and extend eight feet from the outer walls, and look into an open court, whence they derive their light.

About the middle of the fortress, part of a wall remains, through which there is a gateway, surmounted with armorial bearings. This gate seems to have led to the principal apartments. In the centre, are the arms of George, 10th Earl of Dunbar, who succeeded his uncle in 1369, and who besides the earldom of Dunbar and March, inherited the Lordship of Annandale and the Isle of Man from his heroic aunt, Black Agnes of Dunbar. They must have been placed there after his succession, as he was the first who assumed those sculptured Arms: viz, a large triangular shield, and thereon a lion rampant, within a bordure charged with eight roses. The shield is adorned with a helmet, carrying a crest: a horse's head bridled. On the right are the Arms of the Bruces, and on the left those of the Isle of Man.

The castle towers had communication with the sea, and dip low in many places. North-east from the front of the castle is a large natural cavern, chiefly of black stone, which looks like the mouth of the Acheron – a place that leads to melancholy streams. This spot is supposed to have formed part of the dungeon where prisoners were confined, such as Gavin Douglas, Bishop of Dunkeld, who was a prisoner here in 1515. There is, however, also a dark postern which gives access to a rocky inlet from the sea, and it seems probable that it was through this that Sir Alexander Ramsay and his followers entered with a supply of provisions to the besieged in 1338.

It was long said the castle was invulnerable, possibly because of the many sieges it sustained. The castle was built with a red stone similar to that found in the quarries near Garvald. Large masses of walls, which have fallen beneath the weight of time, appear to be vitrified or run together. In the north-west part of the ruins is an apartment about twelve feet square, and nearly inaccessible, which tradition states was the apartment of Mary, Queen of Scots.

History

Early history
The Votadini or Gododdin are thought to have been the first to defend this site as its original Brythonic name, dyn barr, means 'the fort of the point'. By the 7th century, Dunbar Castle was a central defensive position of the Kings of Bernicia, an Anglian kingdom that took over from the British Kingdom of Bryneich.

Northumbria
During the Early Middle Ages, Dunbar Castle was held by an Ealdorman owing homage to either the Kings at Bamburgh Castle, or latterly the Kings of York. In 678 Saint Wilfrid was imprisoned at Dunbar, following his expulsion from his see of York by Ecgfrith of Northumbria.

Later, Dunbar was said to have been burnt by Kenneth MacAlpin, King of the Scots. Certainly he is on record in possession of the castle.

Kingdom of the Scots
In the 10th and early 11th centuries, the Norsemen made increasing inroads in Scotland and in 1005 a record exists of a Patrick de Dunbar, under Malcolm II, engaged against the Norse invaders in the north at Murthlake a town of Marr where alongside Kenneth, Thane of the Isles, and Grim, Thane of Strathearn, he was slain.

The first stone castle is thought to have been built by Gospatric, Earl of Northumbria, after his exile from England, following the Harrowing of the North, by William the Conqueror after Gospatric took refuge at the court of Malcolm III of Scotland. Gospatric was a powerful landowner in both kingdoms and could summon many men, which encouraged Malcolm to give him more lands in East Lothian, the Merse and Lauderdale, as recompense for those lost further south and in return for loyalty as is usual under the feudal system. Sir Walter Scott argued that Cospatric or Gospatrick was a contraction of Comes Patricius. In any case, King Malcolm III is recorded as bestowing the manor of Dunbar &c., on "the expatriated Earl of Northumberland".

In June 1338, Sir Alexander Ramsay of Dalhousie relieved Dunbar Castle and assisted the Countess of Dunbar ("Black Agnes of Dunbar"). Together they successfully defended the castle against the siege by William Montagu, 1st Earl of Salisbury of England.

James IV
The Castle remained the stronghold of the Earls of Dunbar until the forfeiture of George, Earl of March, in 1457, when the Castle was dismantled to prevent its occupation by the English. It was restored by James IV later in the century. Andrew Wood was the keeper. In April 1497 timber was bought for the "Hannis tower" and the master mason Walter Merlioun was completing the gatehouse or "fore work". Nails were bought for the "yetts" of the gatehouse, a wooden portcullis and a metal grille or yett made by Thomas Barker. John the Quarrier excavated a new well. James IV visited in April 1497 and gave the masons drinksilver reward payments in May.

Building lime was brought from Cousland. The hinges or "crukis" for the iron yett were made in the forge at Edinburgh Castle. A carpenter, Patrick Falconer, measured the roof or ceiling of the king's chamber at Edinburgh castle to make a similar roof at Dunbar. In August 1497 two Dunbar carpenters, William Young and Thomas Makachane, started to roof the Hannis tower. In September it was finished by Andrew the "Sclater". Slates and rafters were brought to Dunbar in Will Merrymowth's boat. In 1501 new iron window grills or yetts were provided.

James Stewart, Duke of Albany
The castle came under the control of the Duke of Albany during the minority of James V. During this period that the bulwark to the west was built. It may have been designed by Antoine d'Arces, Sieur de la Bastie who was placed in charge of the castle in December 1514. Albany organised further repairs and amendments in July 1527.

An Italian drawing for a fortification of this period by Antonio da Sangallo the Younger, marked as an opinion for "il Duca D'Albania," has been associated with Dunbar. An article by the historian Bryony Coombs further explores the activities of the Duke of Albany and his architectural and artistic connections that informed the design of the blockhouse and situates the building in a European context, and highlights the resemblance of the drawing to the Fort de Salses as built for Ferdinand II of Aragon.

A servant of the Duke of Albany, William Stewart, hired a team of masons to amend and repair the fortification in June 1527. James V came to the castle frequently in the summer of 1537 after the death of his first wife, Madeleine of Valois, and oversaw the arrangement of his artillery. A Scottish courtier James Atkinhead was installed as Captain.

Rough Wooing
In July 1545 the Earl of Angus mentioned that Edinburgh Castle had been re-fortified, "but as for Dunbar he heard of nothing done to it". French money amounting to £1,370 in 1546 was sent to fund repairs to the castle in 1546. In August 1547 the cannon called "Thrawynmouth" was shipped from Dunbar for use at the siege of St Andrews Castle. Repair works were carried out by Robert Hamilton of Briggis.

The castle was burnt by the Earl of Shrewsbury on a punitive raid during the Rough wooing in 1548. A French soldier, Monsieur La Chapelle was made keeper of the castle on 18 June 1548 and William Hamilton of Humby was captain. Further re-fortifications in 1548 were directed by Piero Strozzi and Migliorino Ubaldini. Regent Arran ordered a mason John Arthur to come from Haddington to work on the castle.

The English soldier Thomas Holcroft described the activities of Peter Landstedt, a lieutenant of the German mercenary Courtpennick (Konrad Pennick), on 24 September 1549. Despite cannon fire from the castle, Landstedt got a foothold in a house in Dunbar, and used the furniture to start fires in the town. Landstedt planned to make an entrenchment in front of the castle to place his guns, and he thought the walls of the castle near the town were "very old and low," and now "revised with earth and mounds", these old walls being stone on the natural rock. He thought the old high walls of the inner court could be broken by bombardment to destroy the "first walls" of the castle. These plans were not realised. Regent Arran gave a tip to "devisaris and draweris of the fort", setting out a new fortification in December 1550.

Reformation crisis
Mary of Guise came to Dunbar Castle in June 1559 in fear of the Protestant Lords of the Congregation who occupied Edinburgh. In May 1560, an Italian engineer was working on further improvements for the French garrison. These works were inspected by Robert Hamilton in Briggs, keeper of Linlithgow Palace and Master of the Royal Artillery, and Robert Montgomery in July 1560, after the death of Mary of Guise, on behalf of the Lords of the Congregation who reported that it was "more ample by the double than it was of before" and capable of holding 500 more soldiers. The new work was immediately demolished as a provision of the Treaty of Edinburgh. 100 English workmen called "pioneers" were sent to the castle in August. Local landowners were tasked with the demolition of part of a "rampire," a rampart with its ditch and counter scarp, and a great platform for artillery. However, the French captain of the Castle Corbeyran de Sarlabous remained in charge of the castle and refurbished a cavern which was within the area scheduled for demolition. The rebel Lord Sempill found a refuge in the castle in August 1560. The Castle remained garrisoned by 60 French troops under the command of Sarlabous until September 1561.

Mary, Queen of Scots
Mary, Queen of Scots made Robert Anstruther captain of Dunbar in July 1561. He took charge of the cannons and ammunition according to an inventory made by Robert Hamilton of Briggs. Soon after her return to Scotland in August 1561, she appointed her half-brother Lord John keeper of the castle. In November 1561 John Chisholm, comptroller clerk of the royal artillery provided six culverins. The master of work William MacDowall and David Rowan, an expert gunner from Edinburgh castle surveyed the fort. Mary stayed at Dunbar with Lord John on 30 December 1562. Chisholm shipped cannon and gun carriages from Dunbar north to Aberdeen and back in October 1562 during operations against the Earl of Huntly.

Mary appointed Simon Preston of Craigmillar captain of Dunbar. She visited in February 1564 and came to stay at the castle for a week in November 1564. In August 1565, during the rebellion against Mary, Queen of Scots called the Chaseabout Raid, she ordered repairs to the gun emplacements and artillery, and hand tools that might be needed to re-build the ramparts during a siege. She was brought to the castle by the Earl of Bothwell and then confronted her enemies at the battle of Carberry Hill on 15 June 1567.

There was a siege in September 1567 to eject Bothwell's supporters and the captain, Patrick Whitelaw or Quhytelaugh. John Chisholm brought guns from Edinburgh Castle. William Kirkcaldy of Grange was made keeper of the castle. Dunbar Castle was finally slighted by order of the Parliament of Scotland in December 1567. Dunbar and the fortress on Inchkeith were to be "cast down utterly to the ground and destroyed in such a way that no foundation thereof be the occasion to build thereupon in time coming." The Historie of King James the Sext notes the order to demolish the "king's hous of strenthe." In September 1568, some of the stone was selected for reuse at the quayside of the Shore of Leith.

See also
List of places in East Lothian

References

External links

Video footage of the castle and harbour

Castles in East Lothian
Castles and forts of the Rough Wooing
History of East Lothian
Dunbar